Asavela Mngqithi is a South African actress and model. She is best known for the roles in the television serials Isibaya and Abomama.

Personal life
Mngqithi enrolled for a degree in camera and editing from the AFDA, The School for the Creative Economy (AFDA), but later dropped out after third year due to financial problems. Her father, Manqoba Mngqithi is a South African football coach. She has one younger sister.

She is married to Thabo Smol and the couple has one daughter.

Career
In 2018, she made auditions for a role in the Mzansi Magic soap opera Isithembiso. However, she was then called back to audition for another Mzansi Magic soap opera Isibaya. She finally joined with the cast for the fifth season of the soapie and played the role "Ntwenhle". Her role became very popular, where she continued to play the role eighth and final season of the soapie in 2021.

After that in 2021, she made her second television role in season two of 1Magic drama series Abomama. In the series, she played the role of "Amogelang".

Filmography

References

Living people
21st-century South African actresses
South African television actresses
People from Umzimkhulu Local Municipality
People from eThekwini Metropolitan Municipality
Year of birth missing (living people)